The Bowling competition of the 2011 Pan American Games in Guadalajara, Mexico will be held at the Tapatío Bowling Alley from October 24 to October 27. There will be 4 events contested two each for men and women.

Medal summary

Medal table

Events

Schedule
All times are Central Daylight Time (UTC-5).

Qualification

The qualifier was the 2009 PABCON Senior Pan American Championship. It was held in San Juan, Puerto Rico between September 20–27, 2009 in which fifteen countries in both men’s and women’s categories qualified. Mexico, as the host country of the Games, automatically qualified to participate in both categories. A National Olympic Committee (NOC) may enter up to 2 athlete per gender. There is a maximum of 64 competitors allowed (32 per gender).

References

 
2011
Events at the 2011 Pan American Games
2011 in bowling